There are ten scheduled monuments in Coventry. In the United Kingdom, a scheduled monument is a "nationally important" archaeological site or historic building that has been given protection against unauthorised change by being placed on a list (or "schedule") by the Secretary of State for Digital, Culture, Media and Sport; English Heritage takes the leading role in identifying such sites. Monuments are defined in the Ancient Monuments and Archaeological Areas Act 1979 and the National Heritage Act 1983. Scheduled monuments—sometimes referred to as scheduled ancient monuments—can also be protected through listed building procedures, and English Heritage considers listed building status to be a better way of protecting buildings and standing structures. A scheduled monument that is later determined to "no longer merit scheduling" can be descheduled.

Coventry is an ancient city and a metropolitan borough in the West Midlands of England. The city's history dates back to at least the 11th century (CE), and by the 14th century, it was a thriving centre of commerce. Like several of the other monuments in the city, Coventry's city walls were erected towards the end of the 14th and the beginning of the 15th centuries, though city walls served little defensive purpose by that time and were largely a status symbol.

The oldest monuments on this list—Caludon Castle and St Mary's Priory and Cathedral—were built in the 11th century. Both are now ruins. Coventry's most modern scheduled monument is Vignoles Bridge—a single-span iron footbridge over the River Sherbourne, made in 1835 and moved to its current location in 1969.

Monuments

See also
History of Coventry
Grade I listed buildings in Coventry
Grade II* listed buildings in Coventry

Notes

References

Archaeological sites in the West Midlands (county)
Scheduled
Coventry
Scheduled